Agua Puerca is a small village in the Mexican state of San Luis Potosí, in the municipality of Tamasopo.

Agua Puerca has a population of about 500 people. Its name means "Dirty water," because the water used to be so poor in quality. The town only got electricity in March  2005, and has yet to get running water. When the well in the town is full, people are able to get all of their water from there. When it is dry, however, they must walk over an hour away to get water. The NGO Tools for Development has been assisting the people of the town in many ways, organizing Humanitarian Brigades and the like.

References

External links
http://toolsfordevelopment.org/

Populated places in San Luis Potosí